Psychotria plicata is a species of plant in the family Rubiaceae. It is endemic to Jamaica.

References

plicata
Vulnerable plants
Endemic flora of Jamaica
Taxonomy articles created by Polbot